Zamboanga del Norte's 3rd congressional district is one of the three congressional districts of the Philippines in the province of Zamboanga del Norte. It has been represented in the House of Representatives since 1987. The district encompasses the southern half of the province consisting of the municipalities of Baliguian, Godod, Gutalac, Kalawit, Labason, Leon B. Postigo, Liloy, Salug, Sibuco, Siocon, Sirawai and Tampilisan. It is currently represented in the 19th Congress by Ian Amatong of the Liberal Party (LP).

Representation history

Election results

2022

2019

2016

2013

2010

See also
Legislative districts of Zamboanga del Norte

References

Congressional districts of the Philippines
Politics of Zamboanga del Norte
1987 establishments in the Philippines
Congressional districts of Zamboanga Peninsula
Constituencies established in 1987